Bob Tetzlaff (November 13, 1935 – September 27, 2012) was an American cyclist. He competed in the individual road race and team time trial events at the 1960 Summer Olympics.

References

External links
 

1935 births
2012 deaths
American male cyclists
Olympic cyclists of the United States
Cyclists at the 1960 Summer Olympics
Sportspeople from Milwaukee